Ashik Kerib (Georgian: აშიკ-ქერიბი) ("strange ashik") is a 1988 Soviet art film directed by Dodo Abashidze from Georgia and Sergei Parajanov from Armenia that is based on the short story of the same name by Mikhail Lermontov. It was Parajanov's last completed film and was dedicated to his close friend Andrei Tarkovsky, who had died two years previously. The film also features a detailed portrayal of Azerbaijani culture.

Plot

An ashik wants to marry his beloved, but her father opposes since he is poor and he expects rich prospects for his 'daughter from heaven'. She vows to wait for him for a thousand days and nights until he comes back with enough money to impress her father. He sets out on a journey to gain wealth and encounters many difficulties, but with the help of a saintly horseman, he returns to his beloved on the 1001st day and they are able to marry.

Style 
The entire story is told in a way of Azerbaijan folklore with music and colour playing a key role. Dialogue is minimal and scripts are used to narrate the plot changes. The director included intentional anachronisms such as the use of submachine guns and a movie camera.

Themes
Parajanov's previous three major films Shadows of Forgotten Ancestors, The Color of Pomegranates, The Legend of Suram Fortress were colourful illustrations of Ukrainian, Armenian and Georgian culture respectively. Ashik Kerib similarly explores traditional Azerbaijani clothes, music, dance, art and customs.

Awards
1988 — Felix Award: Presented to the artists Georgi Aleksi-Meskhishvili, Niko Zandukeli and Shota Gogolashvili.
1989 — Istanbul International Film Festival: Special Prize of the Jury (to Sergei Parajanov)
1990 — Nika Award: 
Best Live-action Film and Best Director (both to Dodo Abashidze & Sergei Parajanov)
Best Cinematography (to Albert Yavuryan)
Best Production Designer (to Sergei Parajanov)

External links

DVDBeaver - comparison of DVD versions (Kino Video vs. Ruscico)
Ashik Kerib at Parajanov.com

Georgian-language films
Azerbaijani-language films
Soviet-era films from Georgia (country)
Soviet-era Azerbaijanian films
Films shot in Azerbaijan
1988 drama films
1988 films
Mikhail Lermontov
Films based on short fiction
Films directed by Sergei Parajanov
Kartuli Pilmi films